"Santa Marinella" is a song by Italian singer-songwriter Fulminacci. It was released on 4 March 2021 by Maciste Dischi and was included in his second studio album Tante care cose.

The song premiered on the second evening of the Sanremo Music Festival 2021 and ranked sixteenth at the end of the competition.

Music video
The music video for "Santa Marinella", directed by Danilo Bubani, premiered on 11 March 2021 via Maciste Dischi's YouTube channel.

Track listing

Charts

Certifications

References

2021 songs
2021 singles
Sanremo Music Festival songs